Vytautas Lesčinskas (20 January 1922 – 8 August 1977) was a Lithuanian basketball player. He won the gold medal with the Lithuania national basketball team during EuroBasket 1939.

Lesčinskas died in Kaunas on 8 August 1977, at the age of 55.

References

Sources
 Vidas Mačiulis, Vytautas Gudelis. Halė, kurioje žaidė Lubinas ir Sabonis. 1939–1989 – Respublikinis sporto kombinatas, Kaunas, 1989

1922 births
1977 deaths
FIBA EuroBasket-winning players
Lithuanian men's basketball players